Karavayev or Karavaev is a Russian masculine surname, its feminine counterpart is Karavayeva or Karavaeva. It may refer to:

Dmitry Kuzmin-Karavayev (1886–1959), Russian revolutionary
Irina Karavayeva (born 1975), Russian trampolinist
Oleksandr Karavayev (born 1992), Ukrainian football midfielder
Oleg Karavayev (1936–1978), Soviet wrestler 
Valeriya Karavayeva (born 1993), Kazakhstani handball player 
Vladimir Kuzmin-Karavayev (1859–1928), Russian legal scholar and politician, father or Dmitry
Vyacheslav Karavayev (born 1995), Russian football player

Russian-language surnames